Ebrahim Khesar (also Romanized as Ebrāhīm Khesār; also known as Ebrāhīm Ḩeşār and Ibrāhīm Hisār) is a village in Il Gavark Rural District, in the Central District of Bukan County, West Azerbaijan Province, Iran. At the 2006 census, its population was 198, in 31 families.

References 

Populated places in Bukan County